Domnitsa Lanitou-Kavounidou (7 April 1914 – 20 June 2011) was a Greek sprinter. She competed in the women's 100 metres at the 1936 Summer Olympics.

References

External links
 

1914 births
2011 deaths
Athletes (track and field) at the 1936 Summer Olympics
Athletes (track and field) at the 1948 Summer Olympics
Greek female sprinters
Olympic athletes of Greece
Sportspeople from Limassol
Olympic female sprinters
20th-century Greek women